Treis-Karden is a former Verbandsgemeinde ("collective municipality") in the district of Cochem-Zell, in Rhineland-Palatinate, Germany. The seat of the Verbandsgemeinde was in Treis-Karden. It was disbanded in July 2014.

The Verbandsgemeinde of Treis-Karden consisted of the following Ortsgemeinden ("local municipalities"):

Former Verbandsgemeinden in Rhineland-Palatinate